The 2014 Copa Centroamericana (also known as the Central American Cup Tigo 2014 USA for sponsorship reasons) was the 13th Copa Centroamericana, the regional championship for men's national association football teams in Central America. It was organized by the Unión Centroamericana de Fútbol or UNCAF, and took place in the United States.

Overview
In January 2013, UNCAF tentatively announced that the competition would be hosted in the United States, specifically California and Texas. Eduardo Li, the President of the Costa Rican FA and vice-president of UNCAF said that the competition is to celebrate 25 years of UNCAF.  The announcement became official in January 2014, and it was announced that the competition would take place in September 2014.

Following the announcement, UNCAF President Rafael Tinocco said that September 2014 was chosen because "September is the month of independence" and that there are nine days in September on the FIFA International Match Calendar which would allow national associations to choose their first choice players. Tinocco also stated that the competition would be hosted outside of the Central American region, and hosted in United States due to the "money factor".

The top four teams would qualify for the 2015 CONCACAF Gold Cup. The fifth place team would advance to a play-off against the fifth place team from the 2014 Caribbean Cup tournament to determine which other nation will qualify for the 2015 CONCACAF Gold Cup. This is the first time that the two overall fifth-placed teams compete to qualify for the CONCACAF Gold Cup, previously five teams from Central America and four from the Caribbean have qualified for the Confederation's competition.

The winner of the tournament would qualify for the Copa América Centenario, a 16-team tournament of CONMEBOL and CONCACAF national teams to be held in the United States in 2016.

FIFA calendar issue
Two of the four competition dates fall outside of the FIFA International Match Calendar's "international window" for September 2014. Any two dates between 1 and 9 September at least three days apart were allocated as possible fixture dates in the window, meaning that the fixtures that took place on 3 and 7 September would be able to have a first choice selection available as clubs would be unable to reject call-ups, while the fixtures that took place on 10 and 13 September (including the final) would require the players' clubs to agree that players could participate.

Teams
All seven UNCAF member national teams participated in the tournament.

Bold indicates that the corresponding team was hosting the event.

Venues

In May and June 2014, UNCAF announced that the following venues would host the tournament:
The RFK Memorial Stadium in Washington, D.C. hosted the three matches of the first day of group stage on 3 September.
The Cotton Bowl in Dallas hosted the three matches of the second day of group stage on 7 September.
The BBVA Compass Stadium in Houston hosted the three matches of the last day of group stage on 10 September.
The Los Angeles Memorial Coliseum in Los Angeles hosted the final, third-place and fifth-place matches on 13 September.

Squads

Officials
The following officials were selected for the tournament:

Referees
Roberto Moreno (Panama)
Jeffrey Solís (Costa Rica)
Héctor Rodríguez (Honduras)
Joel Aguilar (El Salvador)
Walter López (Guatemala)
Roberto García (Mexico)
Sandy Vásquez (Dominican Republic)
Jair Marrufo (United States)

Assistant referees
Daniel Williamson (Panama)
Leonel Leal (Costa Rica)
Octavio Jara (Costa Rica)
Keytzel Corrales (Nicaragua)
Oscar Omar Velasquez (Honduras)
Juan Zumba (El Salvador)
Gerson Lopez Castellanos (Guatemala)
Adam Garner (United States)

Group stage
The draw for the group stage was made on 29 January 2014. The schedule was announced on 17 July 2014. Changes to the schedule were made on 18 August.

Tiebreakers

The teams are ranked according to points (3 points for a win, 1 point for a tie, 0 points for a loss). If tied on points, tiebreakers are applied in the following order:
Greater number of points in matches between the tied teams.
Greater goal difference in matches between the tied teams (if more than two teams finish equal on points).
Greater number of goals scored in matches among the tied teams (if more than two teams finish equal on points).
Greater goal difference in all group matches.
Greater number of goals scored in all group matches.
Drawing of lots.

Group A

Group B

Final stage
In the final stage, if a match is level at the end of normal playing time, the match is determined by a penalty shoot-out (no extra time is played).

Fifth place match

Honduras advanced to represent the Central American Football Union at the 2015 CONCACAF Gold Cup qualification play-off, where they faced French Guiana, the 2014 Caribbean Cup fifth-placed team.

Third place match

Final

Costa Rica qualified for the Copa América Centenario.

Awards
The following awards were given at the conclusion of the tournament:

Goalscorers
4 goals

 Marco Pappa

2 goals

 Celso Borges
 Johan Venegas
 Rafael Burgos
 Carlos Ruiz
 Blas Pérez
 Román Torres

1 goal

 Deon McCaulay
 Juan Bustos
 Bryan Ruiz
 Marco Ureña
 Arturo Alvarez
 Richard Menjivar
 Marvin Ávila
 Anthony Lozano
 Roberto Nurse

Own goals

 Jeromy James (playing against Honduras)
 Elroy Smith (playing against Honduras)

Final ranking

References

External links
Copa Centroamericana, UNCAFut.com 
Central American Cup, CONCACAF.com

 
2014 in Central American football
2011
2014
2014–15 in Salvadoran football
2014–15 in Costa Rican football
2014–15 in Honduran football
2014–15 in Guatemalan football
2014–15 in Nicaraguan football
2014–15 in Panamanian football
2014–15 in Belizean football
2014 in American soccer
2014 in sports in California
2014 in sports in Texas
2014 in sports in Washington, D.C.
September 2014 sports events in the United States